Klippans FF is a Swedish football club located in Klippan.

Background
Klippans FF were formed in 2004 following the merger of Klippans Boll och Idrottsförening and Forsby Idrottsförening.  Klippans BIF were founded on 8 July 1914 and were based at Åbyvallen. From 1933–34 to 1946–47 they played in Division 3, which at that time was the third tier of Swedish football. Forsby IF were founded on 10 August 1934 and played at Forsby IP.

Klippans FF currently plays in Division 4 Skåne Nordvästra which is the sixth tier of Swedish football. They play their home matches at the Åbyvallen in Klippan.

The club is affiliated to Skånes Fotbollförbund. Klippans FF played in the 2008 Svenska Cupen and beat IFK Klagshamn on penalties in the first round before losing 0–5 at home to Falkenbergs FF in the second round with an attendance of 227 people.

Season to season

In the 12 seasons before the merger Klippans BIF competed in the following divisions:

Klippans FF have competed in the following divisions to date:

Footnotes

External links
 Klippans FF – Official website

Sport in Skåne County
Football clubs in Skåne County
2004 establishments in Sweden